Lee Yeong-hoon (born December 14, 1982) is a South Korean actor.

Early life
Lee Yeong-hoon began his acting career after joining the MBC Academy while in high school. Some of his peers at academy also went on to future stardom, such as Jo In-sung and Lee So-yeon.

Career
In 2001, at the age of 19, Lee made his acting debut win the short film Good Romance, directed by filmmaker Leesong Hee-il. Lee entered Suwon Science College as a Broadcasting major, and he performed numerous times on stage while at university.

Upon his discharge from mandatory military service, Leesong Hee-il again cast Lee, this time in the leading role in the indie feature No Regret. An attempt to realistically portray the lifestyle of a young gay man working in the host club industry, No Regret became a ground-breaking film in Korean queer cinema. It traveled the film festival circuit, screening to packed audiences at the 2006 Busan International Film Festival. Lee won Best New Actor at the Korean Association of Film Critics Awards, and he appeared in his first commercial in 2007 for McDonald's.

This was followed by his first major commercial film, the 2008 horror-thriller The Guard Post. Lee was praised by The Korea Times for "shining brightly" in his role as the prime suspect in a massacre of 20 soldiers in the DMZ, and received Best New Actor nominations from the Blue Dragon Film Awards and Korean Film Awards.

Lee continues to star in independent films, including romance drama Ride Away and hip hop-themed The Beat Goes On.

Filmography

Film

Television series

Theater

Awards and nominations

References

External links
  
  
 
 Lee Young-hoon at Sim Entertainment 
 
 
 

1982 births
Living people
South Korean male film actors
South Korean male television actors
People from Gwangju